Letz Sushi is a Danish chain of sushi restaurants headquartered in Copenhagen. It focuses on sustainable sushi and saving the world oceans. It currently consists of 20 restaurants and a retail division delivering to 500 supermarkets and convenience stores.

History
Letz Sushi was founded when Louise Ertman Baunsgaard opened a sushi take-away restaurant at Nordre Frihavnsgade No. 15 in March 2003. Over the next decade, it grew with an additional five restaurants. In 2013, it merged with Dondon Sushi, a chain founded by Jysk heir Jacob Brunsborg in 2008, bringing the total number of Letz Sushi restaurants up to 13. In 2016, Anders Barsøe replaced Louise Ertman Baunsgaard as CEO of the company. He came from a position as CEO of Meyers Bagerier.

Restaurants
 Nørre Farimagsgade 63, City Centre
 Overgaden Neden Vandet 41, Christianshavn
 Nordre Frihavnsgade 15, Østerbro
 Amagerbrogade 142, Amager
 Værnedamsvej 8, Vesterbro
 Kalvebod Brygge 59m Vesterbro
 Elmegade 23, Nørrebro
 Fredensvej 1, Nørrebro
 Godthåbsvej 49, Frederiksberg
 Strandvejen 68C, Hellerup
 Lyngby Hovedgade 49, Kongens Lyngby
 Rungsted Bytorv 3, Ringsted
 Vedbæk Stationsvej 14, Vedbæk

References

External links
 Official website

Restaurant chains in Denmark
Restaurant groups in Denmark
Restaurants in Copenhagen
Japanese restaurants
2003 establishments in Denmark
Danish companies established in 2003
Companies based in Copenhagen Municipality